Aššur-rēša-iši I, inscribed maš-šur-SAG-i-ši and meaning “Aššur has lifted my head,” ruled 1132–1115 BC, son of Mutakkil-Nusku, was a king of Assyria, the 86th to appear on the Assyrian King List and ruled for 18 years. The Synchronistic King List and its fragmentary copies give him as a contemporary of the Babylonian kings Ninurta-nādin-šumi, Nebuchadnezzar I and Enlil-nādin-apli, although the last of these is unlikely per the commonly accepted chronology.

Biography

His royal titles included “merciless hero in battle, crusher of the enemies of Aššur, strong shackle binding the insubmissive, one who puts the insubordinate to flight, …murderer of the extensive army of the Ahlamȗ (and) scatterer of their forces, the one who … defeats the lands of […], the Lullubû, all the Qutu and their entire mountainous region and subdues them at his feet…” 
He styled himself mutēr gimilli māt Aššur, “avenger of Assyria,” and seems to have directed his earlier campaigns to the east, as a broken chronicle records his campaign staged from Erbil into the disputed Zagros mountains where his shock troops (ḫurādu) encountered the Babylonian king Ninurta-nādin-šumi, here called Ninurta-nādin-šumāti, whose forces characteristically “fled,” a recurring motif in Assyrian accounts of their relationship with their southern neighbour.

Pressures from the west, however, were to draw Aššur-rēša-iši’s attention, and that of his successors’, as the widespread (rapšāti) hordes of Ahlamȗ nomadic tribesmen were driven by the deprivations of climate change into the Assyrian hinterland. Here he may also have encountered Nabû-kudurrī-uṣur, who like him claimed victories against the Amorite lands and the Lullubû.

The Synchronistic History has a lengthy passage concerning his conflicts with Nebuchadnezzar I. Initially they established an amicable relationship. However the Babylonian king subsequently besieged the Assyrian fortress of Zanqi and when Aššur-rēša-iši approached with his relief force, Nebuchadnezzar I torched his siege engines (nēpešū) to prevent their capture and withdrew. On a second campaign, he laid siege to the fortress of Idi and the arrival of the Assyrian army resulted in a pitched battle in which he “brought about his total defeat, slaughtered his troops and carried off his camp. Forty of his chariots with harness were taken away and Karaštu, Nebuchadnezzar I's field-marshal, was captured.” 

The later king Šulmānu-ašarēdu III credited him with rebuilding the city wall of Assur in his own rededication. His own brick inscriptions from the same city identify him as builder of the temple of the gods Adad and An, Ištar of Assyria and Aššur. He built a palace in Bumariyah, ancient Apqu ša Adad, as witnessed by a baked brick inscription. His most significant construction efforts were witnessed at his capital, Nineveh, the location of his palace, the Egalšaḫulla (“The Palace of Joyfulness”), where he rebuilt the tower-gates of the temple of Ishtar which had been damaged by earthquakes during the earlier reigns of Šulmānu-ašarēdu I (c. 1274–1245 BC) and Aššur-dān I (c. 1179 to 1134 BC), the latter being his grandfather. These were flanked by monumental statues of lions.

His palace edict concerning men fraternizing with palace women gives the penalty of execution, with silent witnesses considered a party to the event and punished by being thrown into an oven. The sequence of limmu officials in the eponym dating system is not known, as column 2 of the only extant list is damaged at this point.

He was succeeded by his son, Tukultī-apil-Ešarra I.

Inscriptions

References

12th-century BC Assyrian kings